John Edward Augustus Riggs Miller (1770 – 2 August 1825) was an English first-class cricketer with amateur status who played for Old Etonians in one first-class match in 1791, totalling 9 runs with a highest score of 9.

Miller was born in Paris, the son of Sir John Riggs Miller and his wife Anna, Lady Miller. He succeeded to his father's baronetcy in May 1798.

References

Bibliography
 

English cricketers
English cricketers of 1787 to 1825
Old Etonians cricketers
1770 births
1825 deaths
Baronets in the Baronetage of Ireland